9 Way Ticket is the third single album by South Korean girl group Fromis 9. The album was released on May 17, 2021 by Off the Record and distributed by Stone Music. The physical version of the single album is available in two versions: "Ticket To Seoul" and "9 Travelers". Both of them consist of the same three songs, including the lead single "We Go".

Background and release 
On May 3, 2021, Off The Record released a teaser photo confirming that fromis_9 would make a comeback with their third single album titled 9 Way Ticket on May 17.

On May 4-6, they released the first set of the concept photos for 9 Way Ticket. On May 7, the "Ticket To Seoul" version of the concept film for 9 Way Ticket was released. On May 8-10, they released the second set of the concept photos for 9 Way Ticket. On May 11, the "9 Travelers" version of the concept film for 9 Way Ticket was released. On May 12-13, they released the tracklist and the highlight medley for 9 Way Ticket respectively, revealing "We Go" as the lead single. On May 14-15, they released the first and second music video teasers for "We Go" respectively.

On May 17, the single album and the music video for "We Go" was released simultaneously.

Track listing 
Credits adapted from Melon.

Charts

Release history

References 

2021 albums
Fromis 9 albums
Korean-language albums
Hybe Corporation albums